Ponch Hawkes (born 1946) is an Australian photographer whose work explores intergenerational relationships, queer identity and LGBTQI+ rights, the female body, masculinity, and women at work, capturing key moments in Australia's cultural and social histories.

Early life and education
Hawkes was born in Abbotsford, Victoria, in 1946 and educated at University High School. She is self-taught, having never formally studied photography. Upon returning to Australia from the United States in the early 1970s, Hawkes, who was working as a journalist for the magazine The Digger, took up photography to enhance her journalistic work.

Work
Her work has been included in major Australian exhibitions such as Melbourne Now (2013) at the National Gallery of Victoria and Know My Name (2021/22) at the National Gallery of Australia. Hawke's work is represented in the collections of numerous significant institutions including the National Gallery of Victoria, National Gallery of Australia, Queensland Art Gallery, State Library of Victoria, City of Melbourne, Horsham Regional Gallery, Monash Gallery of Art, the Women's Art Register, and the Jewish Museum of Australia. Hawkes has collaborated with the Pram factory and Circus Oz, and was the first administrator of the Women's Theatre Group in the 1970s.

Hawkes' photographic work is broad in its scope, including the portrayal of artists, feminists, sportspeople, public figures and candid street-photographs. The photographs are often exhibited as a series or multiples, and the subjects in the work are often invited to actively participate in the process. Through this method, Hawkes pursues a sustained interest in the way individuals use their bodies and the way individuals relate, through their bodies, to each other. Hawke's first exhibited body of work, the 1976 photo essay Our Mums and Us, featured her female friends and their mothers, among them the writer Helen Garner. More recent projects have explored the ageing female body such as in the monumental work 500 strong (2021), that reclaims bodies from shame, empowers the subjects portrayed, and normalises images of older women.  The under-representation of women in politics is explored in the humorous work Changing Faces: Reframing Women in Local Democracy (2020), that depicts 171 local women wearing fake moustaches and beards to challenge gender stereotypes. Hawkes' extensive career is considered an influential part of the Australian feminist art movement.

Exhibitions

Selected solo exhibitions

 500 Strong, Geelong Art Gallery, Shepparton Art Museum, curated by Jane Scott, 2022
 Changing Faces, Bayside City Council Chambers, Melbourne, 2020
 Our Mums and Us and These Women have Just Run 26 Miles, Monash Gallery of Art, Melbourne, Australia, 2013
Eros, Philos and Agape, Melbourne Cricket Ground, 2012
Basil Sellers Creative Arts Fellow, National Sports Museum, MCG, 2011–12
More seeing is NOT Understanding, Monash Gallery of Art, Brisbane Powerhouse, Portland, Redlands Qld, Albury, 2009
Seeing Is Not Understanding, Horsham Regional Gallery, 2009
Trading Places, Heritage Hill Museum, Dandenong and Immigration Museum, Melbourne, 2006
Risk, Monash Gallery of Art, 2005
Sensation, Chrysalis Gallery, East Melbourne, 2005
They're downstairs, North Melbourne Arts House, 2003
Todah, Jewish Museum, St Kilda, Melbourne, 2001
St Vincent’s at Home, Aikenhead Gallery, Melbourne 1999
Relatively Speaking, The Family in Words and Pictures, Chrissie Cotter Gallery, Sydney, and Centre for Contemporary Photography, Melbourne, 1998
Photoworks, Victoria University Gallery, Melbourne, 1997
Circus Oz, Performing Arts Museum Collection, Westpac Gallery, Victorian Arts Centre, Melbourne, 1997
Best Mates, William Mora Gallery, Melbourne, 1990
Generations, National Gallery of Victoria, Melbourne, 1989
Circus Oz in Performance, La Trobe University Gallery and Watters Gallery, Sydney, 1981
Our Mums and Us, Brummels Gallery, Melbourne 1976

Selected group exhibitions

 Flesh After Fifty, Changing Images of Older Women in Art, Abbotsford Convent, Melbourne, Australia, 2021
 Photography Meets Feminism: Australian women photographers 1970s–80s, A Monash Gallery of Art travelling exhibition, 2014–2015
 Beyond Borders, MAP Group, Ballarat International Photo Biennale, 2015
 Melbourne Now National Gallery of Victoria, 2013–2014
 KHEM, Strange Neighbour, Melbourne, Curated by Linsey Gosper, April 11 – May 3, 2014
 Take A Bow, Ballarat Mechanics Institute, 2013
Mining The Collection, Albury City Gallery, 2011
Brummels, Monash Gallery of Art, 2011
Mapping Ballarat, Ballarat Foto Biennale, 2011
Basil Sellers Art prize, (finalist) Ian Potter Museum of Art, 2011
Timelines, National Gallery of Victoria, 2011
Mapping Ballarat, Ballarat International Foto Biennale, 2009
Beyond Reasonable Drought, Old Parliament House, Canberra and touring, 2007
Raised by Wolves, Art Gallery of Western Australia, 2006
Julie Millowick Aquisitive Prize, Castlemaine Festival (winner), 2006
Murray Cod: The Biggest Fish in the River, Swan Hill Gallery and 5 other venues, 2006
Blake prize for Religious Art (finalist), 2006
Josephine Ulrick and Win Schubert Photographic Award, Gold Coast City Art Gallery (finalist), 2006
Olive Cotton Award for Photographic Portraiture, Tweed River Art Gallery, Murwillumbah (finalist), 2006
Making Hay at Shear Outback Center, Hay, NSW, and Span Galleries, Melbourne, 2006
The Interior World: photographs and photographers from Glen Eira City Council's Collection, Glen Eira City Gallery, Caulfield South, Melbourne, 2004
Documenting Australians, A pictorial history of Australian photography, Monash Gallery of Art, Wheelers Hill, 2002
Images of Australian Men, Photographs from the Monash Gallery of Art collection, travelling exhibition, 2002
Exhibit X – Group Photographic Exhibition, Lab X Gallery, St Kilda, 2002
So You Wanna Be a Rock Star, National Portrait Gallery, Canberra, 2002
Ordinary Women, Extraordinary Lives, Melbourne Museum, touring 10 venues, 2001
Woman Photographers, Monash City Gallery, 2000
Feminist Art, RMIT First Line Gallery Melbourne, 1999
Three Melbourne Photographers, Ballarat Festival, Ballarat, 1997
The Power to Move, Aspects of Australian Photography, Queensland Art Gallery, Brisbane, 1996
Six Photographers, Barry Stern Gallery, Sydney, 1995
On the Edge, Australian Photographers of the Seventies, from the collection of the National Library Australia, San Diego Museum of Art, San Diego, 1994
All in the family – Selected Australian Portraiture, National Library of Australia, Canberra, 1994
Domain of the Other, National Gallery of Victoria, Melbourne, 1992
Defective Models – Australian Portraiture 19th and 20th Centuries, from regional, university and private collections, Monash University Gallery, 1990
Portrait Photography, National Gallery of Australia, Canberra, 1989
The Thousand Mile Stare, Australian Centre of Contemporary Art, Melbourne, touring Art and Working Life, Roar Studios, Melbourne, 1988
Shades of Light – Photography and Australia 1839 to 1988, Australian National Gallery, 1988
Living in the Seventies, Australian National Gallery, Canberra, 1986
Australian Photographers, Australian National Gallery, Canberra, 1984
Photographic Work, Perc Tucker Gallery, Townsville The Critical Distance, Artspace Sydney, 1983
Melbourne Theatre Photographers, Ministry for the Arts, Melbourne, 1982
 Eight Woman Photographers, Monash University Gallery, Melbourne and Developed Image, Adelaide, 1981
Woman's Work, La Trobe University Gallery, Melbourne, 1981
Self Portrait/Self Image, Victorian College of the Arts, Melbourne and touring, 1980
100 Artists, Panel Beaters Gallery, Melbourne, 1978
New Conceptualists, Tokyo, 1977
Sister’s Delight, Media Resource Centre Gallery, Adelaide, 1977
Woman Photographers, Pram Factory, Melbourne, 1976

Publications

Beyond Reasonable Drought, The Map Group of Photographers, Five Mile Press, 2009
Trading Places, text by David Crofts, photos by Ponch Hawkes, City of Greater Dandenong,2006
Art of Reconciliation, edited by Ponch Hawkes, City of Melbourne, 2002
Australian Water Polo, A Celebration, by Shane Maloney and Ponch Hawkes, Australian Water Polo Inc. 1998
Women of Substance, Sue Jackson and Gael Wallace with photographs by Ponch Hawkes, Allen and Unwin, 1998
Unfolding: The Story of the Australian and New Zealand AIDS Quilt Projects, by Ponch Hawkes with text by Ainsley Yardley and Kim Langley, McPhee Gribble, 1994 
Best Mates, A Study of Male Friendship, by Ponch Hawkes, McPhee Gribble and Penguin Books, 1990
Generations: Grandmothers, Mothers and Daughters, by Diane Bell with Ponch Hawkes, McPhee Gribble & Penguin Books, Melbourne, 1987
Pay to Play, by Wendy Milson, Helen Thomas and Ponch Hawkes, Penguin,1976

References

Further reading 
 LOOK :Contemporary Photography since 1980, Anne Marsh, Macmillan, 2010
 The New McCulloch's Encyclopedia of Australian Art, Alan McCulloch, Susan McCulloch and Emily McCulloch Childs, Aus Art Editions, 2006
 Art in Australia, Christopher Allen, Thames & Hudson, 1997 
 The Power to Move: Aspects of Australian Photography, Anne Kirker and Clare Williamson, Queensland Art Gallery, 1995
Field of Vision – A Decade of Change: Women's Art in the 70s, Janine Burke, Viking,1990
 Twenty Contemporary Australian Photographers: from Hallmark Cards Australian Photographic Collection, Isobel Combie and Sandra Bryon, National Gallery of Victoria, 1990
 The Critical Distance – Work with Photography, Virginia Coventry, Hale and Iremonger, 1986

External links
 

Living people
1946 births
Australian women artists
Australian photographers